KwaThema Stadium is a multi-use stadium in KwaThema, Gauteng, South Africa. It is currently used mostly for football matches and is the home venue of Valencia FC in the ABC Motsepe League.

References 

Sports venues in Gauteng
Soccer venues in South Africa
City of Tshwane Metropolitan Municipality